Français langue étrangère (French for French as a foreign language, FLE) is the use of French by non-native speakers in a country where French is not normally spoken, similar to English as a foreign language. There is no single test like the TOEFL, but instead a variety of possible tests used to measure language proficiency of non-francophones in non-francophone countries. It is specifically different from Français langue seconde (FLS) which is used when referring to prospective immigrants to francophone countries.  It is related to, but not identical from French immersion, which is a strategy for teaching French as a second (never "foreign") language to children, especially in English Canada.

Diplomas, certifications and examinations
The Centre international d'études pédagogiques (CIEP) of the French Ministry of Education offers three diplomas and an examination. The Diplôme Initial de Langue Française (DILF), DELF and DALF certify a certain level of French, and the Test de connaissance du français (TCF) to demonstrate language proficiency for university admission.

The Alliance française offers 2 certificates and 2 diplomas:  Certificat d’Études de Français Pratique 1 and 2 (CEFP1 and CEFP2), the Diplôme de Langue (DL) and the Diplôme Supérieur Langue et Culture Françaises (DSLCF).

The Paris Chamber of Commerce (Chambre de commerce et d'industrie de Paris or CCIP) offers a variety of diplomas as well as the Test d'évaluation du français (TEF).

See also

Language terminology
 Second language
 Foreign language

General language teaching and learning
 Language education
 Second language acquisition
 Applied linguistics

References

French-language education

ja:フランス語能力テスト